The Land's End Plantation, also known as James Robert Alexander House, is a historic plantation at 1 Land's End Land in rural southeastern Pulaski County, Arkansas, off Arkansas Highway 161 south of Scott.  It is a  working plantation, located on the banks of the Arkansas River.  The main plantation complex includes a 1925 Tudor Revival house, designed by John Parks Almand, and more than 20 outbuildings.  AR 161, which passes close to the main house, is lined by pecan trees planted about 1900 by James Robert Alexander, the plantation owner.

The house and a  portion of the estate was listed on the National Register of Historic Places in 1999.

See also
National Register of Historic Places listings in Pulaski County, Arkansas

References

Houses on the National Register of Historic Places in Arkansas
Houses completed in 1925
Houses in Pulaski County, Arkansas
National Register of Historic Places in Pulaski County, Arkansas
Plantations in Arkansas